Patricia Helen Kennedy Lawford (May 6, 1924 – September 17, 2006) was an American socialite, and the sixth of nine children of Rose and Joseph P. Kennedy Sr. She was a sister of President John F. Kennedy, Senator Robert F. Kennedy, and Senator Ted Kennedy, as well as the sister-in-law of Jacqueline Kennedy. Patricia wanted to be a film producer, a profession not readily open to young women in her time. She married English actor Peter Lawford in 1954, but they divorced in 1966.

Early life
Patricia Helen Kennedy was born in Brookline, Massachusetts. She attended Roehampton Sacred Heart Convent School (now Woldingham School) in London, and Maplehurst Sacred Heart Convent School in Bronxville, New York. In 1945, she received a bachelor of arts degree from Rosemont College, where she was active in both directing and acting in theatrical productions.

She was considered the most sophisticated, yet also the most introverted, of her parents' five daughters. Since childhood she had a fascination with travel and Hollywood. In time, she would become a world traveler, so much so that, as a young girl, she was given assignments by the independent and foreign press to write of her travels. Her ongoing fascination with Hollywood was fueled by her father's stories and adventures there as a movie mogul heading RKO Pictures. After graduating from Rosemont College, she moved to Hollywood, in hopes of becoming a movie producer and director like her father.

Her father apparently believed that she could do as much, once saying, "Pat is the one with head for business. She could really run this town if she put her mind to it."

She worked as a production assistant on patriotic and religious productions such as singer Kate Smith's radio program and Father Peyton's Family Rosary Crusade. When she was 22 years old, Lawford was the producer of I Love to Eat, on NBC-TV; it was the first cooking program on network television.

In her youth, Patricia befriended RMS Titanic survivor Edith Rosenbaum, and made Rosenbaum godmother to her children.

Personal life
She met English actor Peter Lawford through her sister Eunice in the 1940s. They met again in 1949, and again in 1953. They courted briefly, and officially announced their engagement in February 1954. They married on April 24, 1954, at St. Thomas More Church in New York City, twelve days before her thirtieth birthday. They settled in Santa Monica, California, and often socialized with actress Judy Garland and her family. Garland gave birth to her son Joseph at the same hospital, and on the same day, Kennedy gave birth to her son Christopher.

Patricia and Peter (who was a member of Frank Sinatra's "Rat Pack") held lavish parties at their Malibu mansion during the 1950s and early 1960s with guests such as Marilyn Monroe. The Lawford's mansion was a popular venue for the Kennedy brothers to meet with Monroe.

The couple had four children, all born in Saint John's Health Center, Santa Monica: Christopher Lawford (1955–2018), Sydney Maleia Lawford (b. 1956), Victoria Francis Lawford (b. 1958), and Robin Elizabeth Lawford (b. 1961).

Despite the glamorous persona Lawford presented, their relationship suffered strains as early as their brief engagement. Lawford had difficulty adjusting to Kennedy's steadfast Catholicism and her family's larger-than-life image. Kennedy could not tolerate Lawford's heavy drinking, extra-marital affairs, and gradual addiction to drugs. Shortly after her brother Jack's death in 1963, she filed for a legal separation, and the couple was officially divorced in February 1966. She never remarried.

Later years 

After her divorce, Kennedy battled alcoholism, and suffered from tongue cancer. She worked with the John F. Kennedy Library and Museum, as well as with the National Center on Addiction, and was a founder of the National Committee for the Literary Arts, for which she arranged a series of author lectures and scholarships.

Death
Kennedy died of pneumonia at age of 82 on September 17, 2006, in her Manhattan home. She was buried in Southampton Cemetery.

See also 

 Kennedy family
 Kennedy family tree

Notes

References

External links 
 Patricia Kennedy Lawford obituary
 

1924 births
2006 deaths
American socialites
Deaths from pneumonia in New York City
Patricia
People from Brookline, Massachusetts
People from Boston
People from Manhattan
Rosemont College alumni
Catholics from New York (state)
Catholics from Massachusetts